James Aloysius McGrath,  (January 11, 1932 – February 28, 2017) was a  politician and the eighth lieutenant governor of Newfoundland, Canada.

Life
As a young man, McGrath was a member of the Responsible Government League which opposed Newfoundland becoming a province of Canada.  Nevertheless, upon the dominion's joining confederation in 1949, McGrath left to enlist with the Royal Canadian Air Force. He returned to Newfoundland in 1953 and became sales manager with radio station CJON. In 1955, he became secretary of the provincial Progressive Conservative Party association. In 1956, he ran unsuccessfully for the party in the provincial election.

Federal politics
He entered federal politics the next year, and won a seat in the House of Commons of Canada in the 1957 election as the Progressive Conservative Member of Parliament (MP) for St. John's East. In 1962, McGrath became parliamentary secretary to the Minister of Mines and Technical Surveys, and served in that position until he was defeated along with the Diefenbaker government in the 1963 election.

McGrath regained his seat in the 1968 election, and remained in parliament through five subsequent elections.

When the Progressive Conservatives formed the government following the 1979 election, Prime Minister Joe Clark advised the Governor General to appoint McGrath Minister of Fisheries and Oceans. McGrath returned to the opposition bench when Clark's minority government was defeated in the 1980 election.

McGrath was not included in the Cabinet when the Tories returned to power in the 1984 election under Brian Mulroney. Instead, McGrath was appointed chairman of the Special Committee on the Reform of the House of Commons. The report he authored led to a number of procedural changes, including the introduction of election by secret ballot for the position of Speaker of the Canadian House of Commons.  Its recommendations also led to the formation of the Canadian Association of Former Parliamentarians, established in 1996.  McGrath also served as chairman of the Standing Committee on Human Rights.

Retirement
In August 1986, McGrath left politics to accept an appointment as  Lieutenant Governor of Newfoundland. He retired from the position in 1991.

Death

McGrath died at home on February 28, 2017.

Arms

References

External links
Biography at Government House The Governorship of Newfoundland and Labrador

1932 births
2017 deaths
Canadian people of Irish descent
Lieutenant Governors of Newfoundland and Labrador
Progressive Conservative Party of Canada MPs
Members of the 21st Canadian Ministry
Members of the House of Commons of Canada from Newfoundland and Labrador
Members of the King's Privy Council for Canada
People from Buchans